"Frienger" (フレンジャー; Furenjā) is Ai Otsuka's 11th single under the avex trax label and her first of three singles in 2006.

"Frienger" is a catchy, upbeat song. The title is actually a portmanteau of the words "Friend" and "Ranger". The song was used in the CM for au mobile service and was the theme song for the television program "Sports Uruguzu". The B-side track, "Amai Kimochi Maru Kajiri", was used in a Music.jp CM. The music video for the song was filmed in Taiwan.

"Frienger" debuted at #2 on the Oricon Weekly Singles Chart with 70,414 copies sold. It maintained high sales for the following two weeks and sold a total of 173,115 copies in 2006. "Frienger" was Otsuka's best-selling single of 2006 and the 60th best-selling single of 2006 overall. It is currently her fourth best-selling single.

Track listing

Live performances
3 April 2006 – Hey! Hey! Hey! Special
15 April 2006 – Music Fighter
21 April 2006 – Music Station
22 April 2006 – CDTV
1 May 2006 – PopJam DX
29 December 2006 – Sakigake Ongaku Banzuke - "Frienger" + "Ren'ai Shashin"
1 January 2007– CDTV - "Frienger" + "Ren'ai Shashin"

Charts
Oricon Sales Chart (Japan)

References 

2006 singles
Ai Otsuka songs
2006 songs
Avex Trax singles
Songs written by Ai Otsuka